The following lists events that happened during 1957 in Australia.

Incumbents

Monarch – Elizabeth II
Governor-General – Sir William Slim
Prime Minister – Robert Menzies
Chief Justice – Sir Owen Dixon

State Premiers
Premier of New South Wales – Joseph Cahill
Premier of South Australia – Thomas Playford IV
Premier of Queensland – Vince Gair (until 12 August), then Frank Nicklin
Premier of Tasmania – Robert Cosgrove
Premier of Western Australia – Albert Hawke
Premier of Victoria – Henry Bolte

State Governors
Governor of New South Wales – Sir John Northcott (until 3 July), then Sir Eric Woodward (from 1 August)
Governor of Queensland – Sir John Lavarack (until 4 December)
Governor of South Australia – Sir Robert George
Governor of Tasmania – Sir Ronald Cross, 1st Baronet
Governor of Victoria – Sir Dallas Brooks
Governor of Western Australia – Sir Charles Gairdner

Events
 19 January – The last edition of The Argus newspaper is published.
 29 July – The Bega bombing occurs in Bega, New South Wales when Senior Constable Kenneth Desmond Coussens (31), his wife Elizabeth (34) and 7-month-old son Bruce are instantly killed by a bomb placed on their home's veranda. The house was demolished by the explosion at about 2 AM. 8-year-old Roger McCampbell, Coussens step-son, survived. A six-gallon metal cream container filled with 240 sticks of gelignite, stolen from a mine, was placed there by Myron Bertram Kelly.  Coussens dealt with Kelly regarding traffic offences and issued him several traffic fines. Kelly appears to have become angered because Coussens issued further fines and defect notices regarding Kelly's tractor and rotary hoe. On 6 December 1957 Justice McClemens sentenced Kelly to life imprisonment for the 3 murders.
 15 September – Hobart has its wettest day on record with 156.2 millimetres as a result of a slow-moving low pressure system redeveloping over the Tasman Sea
 3 October – Australian National Airways (ANA) is merged with Ansett to form Ansett-ANA.
 Slim Dusty wins his first gold record for A Pub With No Beer.

Science and technology
The CSIRO develop radar and microwave navigation systems for aircraft.

Arts and literature

 Architect Jørn Utzon wins the design competition for the Sydney Opera House
 Ivor Hele wins the Archibald Prize with his Self Portrait
 Elwynn Lynn wins the Blake Prize for Religious Art with his work Betrayal
 Voss by Patrick White wins the inaugural Miles Franklin Literary Award

Film
Robbery Under Arms, film adaptation of the novel of the same name (see ).
Three in One, a television show of three short stories about life in Australia in the 1950s (see ).

Television
 19 January – GTV-9 television station is officially opened in Melbourne.
 6 May – In Melbourne Tonight, TV-Series 1957–1970 (GTV-9's first major production).
Pick-A-Box, TV-Series 1957–1971 (first broadcast as a radio program in 1948)
The Tarax Show, TV-Series 1957–1970 (sponsored by Tarax, a soft drink bottling company from Melbourne.

Sport

 Cricket
 New South Wales wins the Sheffield Shield
 Football
 South Australian National Football League premiership: won by Port Adelaide
 Victorian Football League premiership: Melbourne defeated Essendon 116-55
 Rugby league
 Brisbane Rugby League premiership: Valleys defeated Brothers 18-17
 New South Wales Rugby League premiership: St. George defeated Manly-Warringah 31-9
 Australia hosted and won the 1957 Rugby League World Cup tournament
 Rugby union
 Bledisloe Cup: won by the All Blacks
 Golf
 Australian Open: won by Frank Phillips
 Australian PGA Championship: won by Gary Player
 Horse Racing
 Tulloch wins the Caulfield Cup
 Red Craze wins the Cox Plate
 Todman wins the inaugural Golden Slipper
 Straight Draw wins the Melbourne Cup
 Motor Racing
 The Australian Grand Prix was held at Caversham and won by Lex Davison and Bill Patterson driving a Ferrari
 Tennis
 Australian Open men's singles: Ashley Cooper defeats Neale Fraser 6-3 9-11 6-4 6-2
 Australian Open women's singles: Shirley Fry defeats Althea Gibson 6–3 6–4
 Davis Cup: Australia defeats the United States 3–2 in the 1957 Davis Cup final
 Wimbledon: Lew Hoad wins the Men's Singles
 Yachting
 Kurrewa IV takes line honours and Anitra V wins on handicap in the Sydney to Hobart Yacht Race

Births
 5 January – Kevin Hastings, rugby league player and trainer
 27 February – Robert de Castella, marathon runner
 20 March – David Foster, axeman
 30 March – Debra Byrne, entertainer
 30 March – Alan Fletcher, Australian actor
 9 April – Jamie Redfern, singer
 13 April – Mark Tonelli, swimmer
 18 April – Ian Campbell, long and triple jumper
 22 May – Gary Sweet, actor
 13 July – Penny Cook, actress
 26 July – Wayne Grady, golfer
 14 August – Peter Costello, politician
 16 August – Peter Van Miltenburg, track and field sprinter
 21 September – Kevin Rudd, Prime Minister of Australia (2007–2010)
 22 September – Nick Cave, musician
 4 November – Tony Abbott, Prime Minister of Australia (2013–2015)
 21 December – Tracy Mann, actress
 30 December – Simon Madden, Australian Rules footballer

Deaths
 11 January – Sir Robert Garran (born 1867), Solicitor-General of Australia
 31 January – John Marshall (born 1930), freestyle swimmer
 4 August – John Cain I (born 1882), Premier of Victoria
 27 October – James McGirr (born 1890), Premier of New South Wales

See also
 List of Australian films of the 1950s

References

 
Australia
Years of the 20th century in Australia